Adhyarathri is a 2019 Indian Malayalam-language comedy film directed by Jibu Jacob, written by Sharis Mohammed and Jebin Joseph Anthony, produced and distributed by Central Pictures. The film stars Biju Menon as Manoharan, a marriage broker, along with Manoj Guinness, Aju Varghese, Anaswara Rajan, and Sarjano Khalid in pivotal roles. The film was released on 25 October 2019 coinciding on the occasion of the Diwali fest.

Plot
The film tells the story of the all-consuming Manoharan in a village called Mullakkara in Kuttanadu, surrounded by a lake. Manoharan, who had been running for everything in the country since ancient times, had to be a wedding broker in a special situation twenty-two years ago.
The humiliation of the loss of his sister at the wedding, and the grief of her father's heart attack, have made Manoharan lose to Tresiamma, his rival. Ever since Manoharan became a broker, no couple has fled from Mullakara.

In the meantime, he is given the task to marry off his deceased girlfriend Shalini's daughter, Aswathi, who is the exact look-alike of Shalini. Aswathi is also the granddaughter of a teacher couple who looked after her just like her parents. He confirms Aswathi's marriage with Kunjumon, a small local businessman. However, the story takes a twist when Manoharan learns that Aswathi studying in Bangalore had fallen in love with a boy named Sathya from her college. Later, Manoharan sees his sister in Bangalore and she says that the word of the bride is the last and final word for a marriage and that it's Aswathi's right to marry whomever she wants. Manoharan understands that Aswathi loves Sathya dearly and he agrees to help her marry Sathya and takes her back to Mullakara. He also tells her not to tell anybody that she loves Sathya. Aswathi meets Kunjumon there and he confesses that his love for her had begun in childhood. Unable to tell to him about Sathya, Aswathi tries to find ways to call off the wedding. Aswathi has a childhood friend and she is her best friend.

Meanwhile, Kunjumon receives a letter from a well wisher stating that Aswathi loves another person and that it is for good that he should leave Aswathi. He ignores the warnings and proceeds with the preparations of his marriage. Sathya arrives at Mullakara and takes up a position as a teacher in a tutorial college.

Later Kunjumon finds himself jealous as Aswathi spends more time with the new teacher Sathya than she spends with Kunjumon. Feeling angry, Kunjumon decides to confront her on their wedding eve, only to get knocked into Aswathi's best friend. He tells her about how Aswathi ignores him. Then the best friend reveals that he had been in love with him since childhood but hadn't spoken about it as his marriage had been fixed. Shocked, Kunjumon leaves.

The next day, the wedding is cancelled because Kunjumon is missing. Manoharan tells Aswathi's grandparents that they can marry her to Sathya. They agree to it and Sathya is presented as the groom. However, before the wedding could take place, Manoharan's rival, Tresiamma comes and tells everyone about how she found out that Sathya was originally chosen for Aswathi so that he may get a handsome commission. Aswathi later tells everybody that it was her who loved Sathya and wished to  marry him. The wedding takes place and Kunjumon is found to be married to Aswathi's best friend.

Cast 

Biju Menon as Manoharan Mullakkara
Manoj Guinness as Kunjatta P Kumaran
Aju Varghese as Kunjumon Puthenpurakkal
Anaswara Rajan in double role as
Aswathy Ramachandran
Shalini, Aswathy's mother and Manoharan's girlfriend
Sarjano Khalid as Sathya
Vijayaraghavan as Narayanan Maashu
Sreelakshmi as Sharada
Anu Sithara (cameo) as Anitha, Manoharan's sister
Biju Sopanam as Satheesh
Veena Nair as Shyama Satheesh
Sneha Babu as Satheesh and Syama's daughter
Pauly Valsan as Thresiyamma
Shobha Singh as Kamala
Kollam Sudhi as Sudhi, Kunjumon's assistant
Giriprasad Damodar as Young Manoharan
Althaf Manaf as Young Kunjatta
Aswin Jose as Young Satheesh
Della George as Young Shyama
Jayan Cherthala as Kumaran
Anu Sithara (cameo) as Anitha, Manoharan's sister
Nandhu Pothuval as Attukal Ramakrishnan
Chembil Ashokan as Sudhakaran, Shyama's father
Vinod Kedamangalam as Jose
Prasad Muhamma as Ambrose
Naseer Sankranthi
Shiny T. Rajan as Kunjumon's mother
Jithan V Soubhagom as Bengaluru college student
Mahadevan Mahi as Tutorial Student 1
Vineeth Sreenivasan as Narrator

Production
The film marks the second collaboration of Menon and Jacob after Vellimoonga.

Soundtrack

The music of the film was composed by Bijibal while lyrics were written by Santhosh Varma and B. Ajithkumar.

Release
The film was released theatrically on 4 October 2019.

Box office
The film grossed approximately ₹4.45 crore in its first week run in Kerala. In the overseas opening weekend, it grossed $141,123 in the United Arab Emirates, US$14,202 (₹10.11 lakh) in the United States, US$1,560 (₹1.12 lakh) in Canada, A$371 (₹17,835) in Australia, and NZ$3,910 (₹1.78 lakh) in New Zealand. In three weeks, it grossed US$22,713 (₹16.07 lakh) in the US and A$3,569 (₹1.73 lakh) in Australia.

References

External links
 

2019 films
2010s Malayalam-language films
2019 comedy films
Indian comedy films
Films scored by Bijibal